The 2020–21 Momentum One Day Cup was a domestic one-day cricket tournament that took place in South Africa in January and February 2021. Six teams took part in the tournament, split into two groups. Dolphins were the defending champions. It was the last season of franchise cricket, after Cricket South Africa announced a revamp to their domestic structure in March 2021.

On 3 January 2021, Cricket South Africa confirmed a revised schedule of fifteen matches, with them all played behind closed doors at Senwes Park in Potchefstroom. The six teams were placed into two groups of three, with the top two teams of each group progressing to the semi-finals. On 9 January 2021, Cricket South Africa issued a further revision to the schedule, including moving the Pool B matches forward by one week.

In Pool A, three of the first five matches were abandoned due to rain, resulting in Dolphins winning the group ahead of the final match. The sixth match in Pool A was also abandoned with no play, meaning that Knights advanced to the semi-finals. Lions won their first three matches in Pool B to top the group and advance to the semi-finals. The last match in Pool B, between Cape Cobras and Warriors, was impacted by the weather. Cape Cobras won by 41 runs via the DLS method to become the fourth team to reach the semi-finals.

In the first semi-final, Dolphins beat Cabe Cobras by three wickets to advance to the final. The second semi-final was washed out with no play possible. Lions progressed to the final, after they finished higher than the Knights in the Pool matches. No play was possible on the scheduled day of the final due to rain, with the match moved to the reserve day. The final finished in no result due to rain, with Dolphins and Lions sharing the title.

Teams
The teams were placed into the following groups:

 Pool A: Dolphins, Titans, Knights
 Pool B: Cape Cobras, Lions, Warriors

Fixtures

Pool A

Pool B

Finals

References

External links
 Series home at ESPN Cricinfo

South African domestic cricket competitions
Momentum One Day Cup
2020–21 South African cricket season